OGLE-TR-111 is a yellow dwarf star approximately 5,000 light-years away in the constellation of Carina (the Keel).  Having an apparent magnitude of about 17, this distant and dim star has not yet been cataloged. Because its apparent brightness changes when one of its planets transits, the star has been given the variable star designation V759 Carinae.

Planetary system 
In 2002 the Optical Gravitational Lensing Experiment (OGLE) survey detected that the light from the star periodically dimmed very slightly every 4 days, indicating a planet-sized body transiting the star. But since the mass of the object had not been measured, it was not clear that it was a true planet, low-mass red dwarf or something else.
In 2004 radial velocity measurements showed unambiguously that the transiting body is indeed a planet.

The planet is probably very similar to the other "hot Jupiters" orbiting nearby stars. Its mass is about half that of Jupiter and it orbits the star at a distance less than 1/20th that of Earth from the Sun.

In 2005, evidence of another transit was announced.  Planet "OGLE-TR-111c" is a possible extrasolar planet orbiting the star.  It was first proposed in 2005 based on preliminary evidence from the Optical Gravitational Lensing Experiment (OGLE) survey.  More data is required to confirm this planet candidate. If it is confirmed, OGLE-TR-111 would become one of the first stars with a pair of transiting planets.

See also 
 OGLE-2005-BLG-390L
 List of extrasolar planets

References

External links 

 

Carina (constellation)
Planetary systems with one confirmed planet
Planetary transit variables
G-type main-sequence stars
Carinae, V759